Sean Cox (born 16 January 1985 in Lancaster, Lancashire, England) is a rugby union player. Cox plays as a lock.

References

External links
Sale Sharks profile
Guinness Premiership profile

1985 births
Living people
Edinburgh Rugby players
English rugby union players
Rugby union players from Lancaster
Sale Sharks players
Rugby union locks